Heather Rhiannon Morgan (born ), also known as Razzlekhan, is an American entrepreneur, rapper and suspected money launderer. According to New York authorities, she laundered the proceedings from a heist of US$4.5 billion in cryptocurrencies.

Life
Morgan was born in Oregon, and grew up in Tehama, California. Her father is a retired biologist and her mother is a librarian at a high school.   
Morgan graduated from UC Davis in 2011 with a bachelor’s degree in economics. According to her LinkedIn profile, she began her career as an economist and worked for the World Bank in Cairo and Hong Kong. In 2014 Morgan lived in San Francisco and founded SalesFolk, an e-mail marketing firm.

In February 2022, Morgan and her husband Ilya Lichtenstein were charged by the FBI with conspiracy to launder over $4 billion in stolen bitcoin. The bitcoin were stolen in the 2016 Bitfinex hack. She was released on bail on 14 February 2022.

Self-staging
According to herself she founded a number of start-ups. She was investing in B2B software companies. Morgan was a columnist for Inc. and formerly a Forbes contributor (2017 to 2021). On her TikTok channel she gave business tips for getting rich.

Morgan produced rap videos under the stage name Razzlekhan, in which she described herself as the "Crocodile of Wall Street".  Her stage name is inspired by Genghis Khan.

Discography

References

External links 
 Heather R. Morgan on LinkedIn
 
 Razzlekhan's official website

Living people
Year of birth missing (living people)
American women company founders
American women economists
21st-century women rappers
People from Tehama County, California